Zandhar is a village in Haft Ashiyan Rural District, Kuzaran District, Kermanshah County, Kermanshah Province, Iran. At the 2006 census, its population was 62, in 16 families.

Notes

References 

Populated places in Kermanshah County